Iyarkai is a 2003 Indian Tamil-language romantic drama film directed by S. P. Jananathan in his directorial debut. The film stars Shaam and Radhika. Arun Vijay—who at the time was known as Arun Kumar—makes a cameo appearance while Bollywood actor Seema Biswas plays a supporting role; Iyarkai marks the debuts of Radhika and Biswas in Tamil cinema.

Based on a true story, the film revolves around a young woman who is in unable to accept the love of a sailor because she is in love with a ship captain who got lost at sea. It was made on a budget of 1 crore. Vidyasagar composed the music for the film.

Iyarkai was released on 21 November 2003. Although the film was not very successful at the box office, it won the National Film Award for Best Feature Film in Tamil at the 51st National Film Awards in 2004, and N. K. Ekambaram won the Tamil Nadu State Film Award for Best Cinematographer.

Plot 
Marudhu, a sailor, arrives at Rameshwaram port from Rome. Despite being a Tamilian, he has not visited Tamil Nadu for fourteen years. He plays cards against Dorai and his posse at the bar, which is a popular hang out spot at the port. Nandu, a man Marudhu met at the bar, tells him which stop on the train to get off at to go to the church. Marudhu tells the church father, Stephen, about a nearby ship that capsized and how the ship captain tried to escape. An interested Nancy overhears the conversation. He meets Nancy again at a roadside restaurant run by her sister-in-law, Mercy. One day, Nandu comes to the bar with a bandage over his nose and after Marudhu learns that Dorai and his men did it, they engage in a fight. While fighting Dorai, Marudhu asks him who is he looking for and if it is his lover. Nancy overhears this dialogue, which keeps playing in her head while walking on the train track causing her dress to get stuck on the track. Marudhu sees Nancy about to get hit by an incoming train and saves her. She tells Marudhu to come to the lighthouse at 6 p.m.

Later that day, Marudhu is told by ship crew to get something that was stuck out of his ship's propeller. However, the propeller turns on and Marudhu gets injured, making him unable to come to the lighthouse. To Marudhu's dismay, Nancy tells him that he was not waiting for him, but for a ship captain that she met three years ago. She had first met the ship captain while selling mangoes and had fallen in love with him. However, the ship captain had told her that she can't make a proper judgement about love because she was too young. The ship captain had told her not to wait for him. He gives her a ring and after Nancy repeatedly tells him to return in a year, the ship captain changes his mind and says that he will come back in a year.

Marudhu helps Nancy in her search for the ship captain. Nancy does not know the captain's name since she only addressed him as "Sir" and "Officer", making the search more difficult. She starts to distance herself from Marudhu after he reveals his love for her. One day, Nancy eventually comes across Joe, the ship captain's crewmate, after recognizing him in the bar. He tells Nancy that the ship captain's name is Mukundan and that he died in a shipwreck. Mercy wakes up the next day and realizes that Nancy is missing. She tells Marudhu to go find Nancy. He gets on a ship docked at the port and finds an emotionally unstable Nancy sitting there. Marudhu tried to get her off the ship when a man named Adam tells him that he cannot take her unless he fights him. After the fight, Nancy jumps off the ship and Marudhu jumps off to in order to save her.

Nancy and Marudhu go on a canoe at night in search of Mukundan when Marudhu accidentally loses Nancy's ring. The next day, he returns to ring to Nancy and tells the church father that he and his ship crew are planning to leave on the night of Christmas. He writes his name on one piece of paper and "Captain" on the other and asks the church father to choose one of the papers. On Christmas Eve, Mukundan arrives unbeknown to Nancy, and Marudhu sees him, although Marudhu does know that the man he helped is Mukundan. Marudhu asks if Nancy is willing to accept his love. He starts the open the piece of paper to sees whose name is written before Nancy stops him and agrees to marry him the next day, on Christmas. During the wedding, Nancy sees Marudhu and a bunch of other men dancing with Santa Claus masks. One among the men kneels and presents a ring on Nancy. To Nancy's surprise, the man removes his mask, revealing that he is Mukundan and not Marudhu. A depressed Marudhu leaves aboard his ship and drops the piece of paper into the ocean.

Cast 

 Shaam as Marudhu
 Arun as Mukundan (special appearance)
 Radhika as Nancy
 Senthil as the bar owner
 Seema Biswas as Mercy
 Chinni Jayanth as "Hawala" Arumugam
 Pasupathy as Father Stephen
 Karunas as Nandu
 Crane Manohar as a magician
 Suruli Manohar as a magician
 Kumaravel as an exorcist
 Abhinayashree (special appearance in the song "Seetu Kattu")
 Freddy Odiyo as Joe
 Antony Paul as Dorai
 Ahmed Adam as Adam
 Pondy Ravi as Dorai's friend

Production

Development 
S. P. Jananathan began work on Iyarkai in 2001. The story is based on Jananathan's friend's uncle, who right after getting married, went alone on a boat voyage in the Mediterranean Sea. He got lost and his body was nowhere to be found. Unaware of the situation, his wife awaited his return. Jananathan told the story to producer Ramkumar Ganesan, whose cousin V. R. Kumar became the producer after liking the story. The film was titled Iyarkai because the conflict between man and nature causes a woman to wait for her past lover to return.

Casting and filming 
Suriya turned the offer to play the lead role, saying he was not interested in doing romantic films. He was later replaced with Shaam, with whom Jananathan worked with as an assistant editor in 12B (2001). He was cast in the role of a sailor who knew everything about life except love and accepted to work on the film before the release of 12B. Since the film was shot in a coastal hamlet, Shaam interacted with the locals to imitate their mannerisms. Kannada actress Radhika debuted in Tamil cinema with this film; the media referred to her as "Kutti" Radhika to differentiate her from the Tamil actress of the same name. Radhika played Nancy, a strong, independent women who chooses the man with whom she wants a relationship. Her character was based on Jananathan's friend's uncle's wife.

Arun Kumar was chosen to play the ship captain, a character based on the life of Jananathan's friend's uncle. He turned down the role because it was only a cameo, though later changed his mind after Jananathan explained its importance. Bollywood actor Seema Biswas was cast as Nancy's sister-in-law, marking her Tamil film debut. Although he was advised not to, Pasupathy accepted the role of a priest.  Pop singer Karunas plays a character that sings in the film. Various foreigners played roles in the film including Freddy Odiyo, Antony Paul, and Ahmed Adam. The film's first and second schedules were shot in the first half of 2003. The film's first schedule was a twenty-one day shoot at Rameshwaram, Tiruchendur and Tuticorin. The second schedule was shot at the Andaman Islands. Art directors Sabu Cyril and V. Selvakumar erected a lighthouse set for the film.

Soundtrack 
The music was composed by Vidyasagar and lyrics written by Vairamuthu. The first song Vidyasagar composed for the film, "Kaadhal Vandhaal", was ready during the film's first schedule in Tuticorin. The song was well received upon release. The song "Iyarkai Thaaye" from the film's soundtrack was not included in the film.

Release and reception 

Iyarkai was scheduled to be released on 24 October 2003 coinciding with the Deepavali festival but was delayed. The film released to positive reviews, but it was a box office failure due to the lack of publicity and the film's delay. The film did not lose money because it was produced on a low budget.

Malathi Ranagarajan of The Hindu praised the cinematographer and art directors, stating; "Together with Sabu Cyril-Selvan's art, K. Ekambaram's lens paints a bewitching picture on screen". She also praised the performances of Shaam, Kutty Radhika, Arun Kumar and the foreigners. Visual Dasan of Kalki appreciated the montage shots of the cinematographer and Kutty Radhika's performance but said Seema Biswas was underused.

R. Rangaraj of Chennai Online gave the film a positive review and wrote: "The debutant director, S P Jhananathan, has handled the build-up to the climax and the climax scenes too effectively. The end is rather stunning and unexpected for a Tamil movie". He also said the film's box office prospects could be low due to the lack of commercial elements.

Accolades 
Upon release, Ekambaram sent Iyarkai to the National Awards committee and it won the National Film Award for Best Feature Film in Tamil for 2003, competing with Virumaandi and Pithamagan as that year's submissions. Jananathan wanted to return the award, but he did not do so.

Dropped sequel 
Jananathan wanted to shoot the film's sequel in Fiji, but the film never entered production.

Notes

References

External links 
 

2000s Tamil-language films
2003 directorial debut films
2003 films
2003 romantic drama films
Best Tamil Feature Film National Film Award winners
Films directed by S. P. Jananathan
Films scored by Vidyasagar
Films set on ships
Indian romantic drama films